"Golden Years" is a song recorded by music producer M-Phazes and Australian singer Ruel. The song was released on 14 April 2017, becoming Ruel's official debut single. A remix of the song (which only credits Ruel as the lead artist) by M-Phazes was later released on 16 March 2018.

Ruel performed the song during the 2018 Commonwealth Games opening ceremony.

Music video 
Though a music video for the original track was never released, one was made for the song's remix by M-Phazes, which was released on 16 March 2018—the same day as the track's release.

Reception 
Sosefina Fuamoli from The AU Review said "the final result is something of polished and refined electronic-driven pop" and the song is "primed for radio success".

Elton John, during his Beats 1 radio show, complimented the song, saying "it’s astonishing [how] someone [Ruel] so young can write something so good" and jokingly said "I give up."

Credits and personnel 
Credits for the song's remix adapted from Tidal.

 Ruel Vincent van Djik – lead artist, songwriter
 Mark Landon – producer, songwriter
 Peter Harding – songwriter
 Chris Gehringer – mastering engineer
 Andrei Eremin – mixing engineer
 Phil Anquetil – recording engineer

Formats and track listings 

 Digital download

 "Golden Years" – 3:28

 Digital download – M-Phazes remix

 "Golden Years" (M-Phazes remix) – 3:54

Notes 

 a.The remix does not credit M-Phazes as a lead artist.

References

2019 singles
2019 songs
M-Phazes songs
Ruel (singer) songs
Song recordings produced by M-Phazes
Songs written by M-Phazes
Songs written by Ruel (singer)